High Tider, Hoi Toider, or High Tide English is a dialect of American English spoken in very limited communities of the South Atlantic United States, particularly several small island and coastal townships in the rural "Down East" region of North Carolina, which encompasses the Outer Banks and Pamlico Sound (specifically including Atlantic, Sea Level, and Harkers Island in eastern Carteret County, the village of Wanchese, and also Ocracoke) as well as in the Chesapeake Bay (such as Guinea Neck in Gloucester County and Tangier Island in Virginia and Smith Island in Maryland). High Tider dialect has been observed as far west as Bertie County, North Carolina. The term is also a local nickname for any native resident of these regions.

The dialect does not have a name that is uniformly used in the academic literature, but it is referenced by a variety of names, including Hoi Toider (or, more restrictively based on region, Down East, Chesapeake Bay, or Outer Banks) English, dialect, brogue, or accent.

Wolfram & Schilling-Estes (1997) provides the most detailed study of this variety in North Carolina.

History
The term "hoi toid" appears in a local colloquial rhyme, "It's high tide on the sound side," phonetically spelled "hoi toide on the saind soide" , as a marker of pronunciation (or shibboleth) to sharply differentiate speakers of this dialect from speakers of the mainland Southern dialects. The phrase was first recorded as a significant identifier of the dialect in 1993, and has since been used frequently for "performative" purposes by native speakers to demonstrate the dialect to outsiders.

Most native speakers of the dialect refer to it as a brogue.

With a long history of geographical and economic isolation from mainland North Carolina, residents of Harkers Island and other Outer Banks areas such as Ocracoke Island and Atlantic developed a distinct dialect of English. Linguists who have studied this dialect note that it has "roots... in a number of Early Modern English dialects", including those spoken in different geographical regions of Great Britain in the Early Modern period (approx. 1500-1800). The dialect of these island communities developed in almost complete isolation for over 250 years. High Tider English shares features with other regional dialects of the US Atlantic coast. Certain pronunciation, vocabulary, and grammatical constructions can be traced to eastern and southwestern England (see Westcountry dialect). The distinctness of the dialect has survived because the community continues to depend on traditional trades, like fishing, boat building, and decoy carving, and the coastal tourism trade developed much later on islands like Ocracoke.

As many as 500 islanders on Harkers Island are directly descended from the Harkers Island and Outer Banks original settlers that developed this distinct dialect. Linguists from North Carolina State University, East Carolina University, and other academic institutions continue to conduct research on the island dialect. It has been in slow decline in the 21st century.

Phonological features

The chart below lists the vowel sounds in two High Tider accents: one of Smith Island (Maryland) in the Chesapeake Bay and the other of Ocracoke (North Carolina) in the Outer Banks. The symbol "~" is used here to indicate that pronunciations on either side of it form a spectrum of possibilities. The symbol ">" indicates that the pronunciations to its left are more widespread and pronunciations to its right are more marginal. Phonologically, these two example accents are united under the High Tider dialect primarily by their similar  and  vowels; both also show a greater or lesser degree of "vowel breaking" (or drawling) of the front vowels especially when positioned before the  consonant .

The phonology, or pronunciation system, of High Tider English is highly different from the English spoken in the rest of the United States. The High Tider dialect is marked with numerous unique phonological features and sound changes:

Thus, a word like high may sound like something between HAW-ee and HUH-ee, similar to its sound in Cockney or Australian accents. (This is sometimes mischaracterized by outsiders as sounding very close, like  (the  vowel, leading to the spelling "Hoi Toider" for "High Tider.")
 The  diphthong ends with a more fronted quality, commonly realized as a shorter off-glide with little or no rounding .
 Front vowel raising in certain environments, though most noticeably before  and :
 The r-colored vowel  may have an opener vowel sound: , making the sound of fair almost merge with fire and far.
 There is no cot–caught merger.
 The  vowel is largely fronted, as in much of the rest of the modern-day South: .
 Unstressed, word-final  may be pronounced , causing yellow to sound like yeller, fellow like feller, potato like (po)tater, and mosquito like (mo)skeeter.
 Elision of some medial or final stops, as in cape sounding more like cay.
 Strong, bunched-tongue rhoticity, similar to West Country English, Scottish English, and Irish English,
 Pin–pen merger.

Lexical features
The island dialect has also retained archaic vocabulary in regular usage.  Some examples include mommuck, meaning "to frustrate" or "bother", yethy, describing stale or unpleasant odor, and nicket, meaning a pinch of something used as in cooking.  The islanders have also developed unique local words used in regular conversation, including dingbatter to refer to a visitor or recent arrival to the island, and dit-dot, a term developed from a joke about Morse code, and used to describe any visitor to the island who has difficulty understanding the local dialect.

In popular culture 
In the 1991 Paramount film The Butcher's Wife, the main character Marina is from Ocracoke, North Carolina, and exhibits features of Hoi Toider dialect.

Notes

References

Bibliography

 

North Carolina culture
Virginia culture
Dialects of English
Carteret County, North Carolina
English-American culture in North Carolina